"Planet Claire" is the second single released by The B-52's from their self-titled debut album. Based on Duane Eddy's 1959 version of the Peter Gunn theme song, the single was their second to chart anywhere, at no. 43 in Australia and no. 24 on the US Hot Dance Club Play chart, along with album tracks "Rock Lobster" and "Dance This Mess Around".

In 2011, band member Kate Pierson expressed her dissatisfaction with the way mixing engineer Robert Ash mixed her vocals with the Farfisa organ on the studio version, overlaying excessive audio effects to make her vocals "sound like a synthesizer", and stated that she prefers the rawer sound of live performances where her vocals are more upfront.

Cash Box said that "bongos, Ventures-influenced guitar work and morse code blips are calling all pop, AOR audiences to dance to this humorous followup to 'Rock Lobster.'" Record World said that it has "more unique synthesizer lines and an undeniable rhythm track" compared to "Rock Lobster."

Track listing

Chart positions

References

1979 songs
1980 singles
The B-52's songs
Island Records singles
Songs written by Fred Schneider
Songs written by Keith Strickland
Warner Records singles
Song recordings produced by Chris Blackwell